Evelyn Partners is a financial services company based in the United Kingdom. It is formerly known as Tilney Smith & Williamson, which was the result of a 2020 merger between Tilney and Smith & Williamson. The group also operates the online investment service Bestinvest.

With £52 billion in assets under management,
it is one of the UK's largest wealth managers. It is also the fifth-largest UK accountancy firm by fee income.

History 
Tilney was founded in 1836 in Liverpool as a company for dealing in stocks and shares. 

Smith & Williamson was founded in 1881 in Glasgow, by David Johnstone Smith and Andrew Williamson.

In 2020 Tilney merged with Smith & Williamson to create the Tilney Smith & Williamson group.

In 2022 the company rebranded to Evelyn Partners, retaining Bestinvest as a separate brand ("Bestinvest by Evelyn Partners").

Operations 
The company provides wealth, accountancy and business advisory services to individuals and businesses, including financial planning, investment management, personal and business tax, risk advisory and fund administration.

The company operates offices in 26 cities in the UK, as well as in the Republic of Ireland and the Channel Islands. Its headquarters is in Gresham Street, in the City of London.

References

External links
 Company website

Financial services companies based in London